Moving Through Security is the second studio released album by Evil Cowards. It was released on October 17, 2012.

Track listing 
The track listing for the album was revealed track by track on the band's Facebook page. The video for "Bedford Avenue Wine Distributors" was released in October 24, 2012 

 "Fixing Machines" - 3:08 †
 "Dirty Consuela" - 3:26 †
 "System Overload" - 3:33
 "Moving Through Security" - 3:26
 "Bedford Avenue Wine Distributors" - 3:29
 "Jerkin' Each Other Around" - 2:58
 "Optical Day" - 4:07
 "Dormitory Girls" - 2:59
 "Rich Kids" - 3:40
 "Gravy Train" - 2:48
 "Military Man" - 2:33
 "Lazy as Fuck" - 3:18
 "Summer of the Purple Man" - 3:23

† The digital release has the order of the first two tracks reversed.

Legacy
Dick Valentine recorded an acoustic version of "Rich Kids" for his solo album "Quiet Time".

References

2012 albums
Evil Cowards albums
Electronic albums by American artists